Kao-Ping Hsi Bridge is a cable-stayed bridge over the Gaoping River connecting Dashu, Kaohsiung and Jiuru, Pingtung County in Taiwan. The bridge carries the Freeway 3 and was completed in 1999. The bridge is an important transport corridor between Kaohsiung and Pingtung.And it is a famous landmark in Pingtung.

See also 
List of tallest bridges

References

External links 

1999 establishments in Taiwan
Bridges in Pingtung County
Bridges completed in 1999